The Íþróttafélag Reykjavíkur women's basketball team, commonly known as ÍR, is the women's basketball department of Íþróttafélag Reykjavíkur. It is based in Reykjavík, Iceland.

History
ÍR women's team was founded in 1950 and was one of the pioneers of women's basketball in Iceland as one of the founding members of the women's Icelandic women's championship tournament. It is also one of the most successful women's team in the country, winning a total of 11 national championships.

After not fielding a team since being relegated from the Úrvalsdeild in 2004, the team was revived in 2017 and registered into Division I for the 2017-2018 season. On June 16, 2017, the club hired former player Ólafur Jónas Sigurðsson as the head coach of the team.

In June 2021, the team hired Kristjana Eir Jónsdóttir, the former assistant coach of ÍR men's team, as its head coach. She replaced Ísak Máni Wíum who led the team to a second place finish during the 2020–21 season.

Arena
ÍR plays its home games at the Hertz-Hellirinn.

Notable players

Coaches

 Hrefna Ingimarsdóttir: 1950–1959
 Einar Ólafsson: 1959–1964, ?–1975, 1980–1981 
 Robert Stanley: 1981–1982
 Jim Dooley: 1982–1983
 Kristinn Jörundsson: 1983–1984 
 Hreinn Þorkelsson: 1984–1985 
 Benedikt Ingþórsson: 1985–1986
 Kristján Oddsson: 1986–1987
 Jón Jörundsson: 1987–1989, 1994, 1995
 Thomas Lee: 1989–1990 
 Kristján Sigurður F. Jónsson: 1990–1992 
 Helgi Jóhannsson: 1992–1993
 Einar Ólafsson: 1993–1994
 Bragi Reynisson: 1994
 Jón Örn Guðmundsson: 1994–1995
 Eggert Garðarsson: 1995–1996
 Antonio Vallejo: 1996–1997 
 Karl Jónsson: 1997–1999
 Hlynur Skúli Auðunsson: 2003–2004
 Ólafur J. Sigurðsson: 2017–2020
 Ísak Máni Wíum: 2020–2021
 Kristjana Eir Jónsdóttir: 2021–2022
 Ari Gunnarsson 2022
 Sigurbjörg Rós Sigurðardóttir 2022–present

Trophies and awards

Trophies
 Úrvalsdeild kvenna: (11)
1956, 1957, 1958, 1963, 1966, 1967, 1970, 1972, 1973, 1974, 1975

Icelandic Basketball Cup: (1)
1979

Division I: (1)
2003

Awards
Úrvalsdeild Women's Domestic Player of the Year
 Linda Stefánsdóttir – 1991, 1993

Úrvalsdeild Women's Domestic All-First Team
 Linda Stefánsdóttir – 1990, 1991, 1992, 1993, 1996
 Anna Dís Sveinbjörnsdóttir – 1996
Úrvalsdeild Women's Young Player of the Year
 Gréta María Grétarsdóttir – 1994
 Þórunn Bjarnadóttir – 1997
 Guðrún A. Sigurðardóttir – 1998 
 Hildur Sigurðardóttir – 1999

Úrvalsdeild kvenna Coach of the Year
 Antonio Vallejo – 1997
 Karl Jónsson – 1998

References

External links
Official Website
Félög - ÍR - kki.is  

ÍR (basketball)
Sport in Reykjavík